The Central States Football League (CSFL) was a college athletic conference affiliated with the NAIA.  Member institutions were located in Oklahoma, Texas, Arkansas and Arizona and competed only in football.  The conference was established in 2000 and its charter members included Haskell Indian Nations University, Langston University, Northwestern Oklahoma State University, Southwestern Assemblies of God University, and Peru State College. In 2017, the Sooner Athletic Conference, which served as the primary conference for the majority of the CSFL's membership decided to sponsor football beginning in 2018. As a result the conference's membership shifted to that conference.

Members

The Central States Football League did not compete in the 2012 season.

Final members

Earlier members

Haskell Indian Nations — dropped football in 2015.

Membership timeline

References 

 
Articles which contain graphical timelines